Lake Washington Shipyards was a shipyard in the northwest United States, located in Houghton, Washington (today Kirkland) on the shore of Lake Washington, east of Seattle. Today, the shipyards are the site of the lakeside Carillon Point business park. The shipyards built many civilian and U.S. Navy ships.

History

Lake Washington Shipyard was founded in the 19th century as the Anderson Shipyard. This shipyard specialized in the construction of wooden tugs and ferries. In 1923, Anderson Shipyard was bought by Charles Burckardt and renamed Lake Washington Shipyards. The new shipyard converted to steel shipbuilding. During World War II, its workforce grew to 9,000 employees and it was a major repairer of small ships as well as a builder. Lake Washington Shipyards closed in 1960s and today, the commercial/residential development at Carillon Point occupies the site of the former shipyard.

Ships built here
Ships built at Lake Washington Shipyards include (with launch dates).  Many of the US Navy's AVP-class seaplane tenders were transferred to the US Coast Guard after World War II and redeployed as High Endurance Cutters and Ocean Station vessels:

Issaquah (ferry) 1914
MV Kitsap 1925
Bessie Mac - recreational vessel, delivered in 1926
Seafarer - recreational vessel, delivered in 1926
Dixie II - fishing vessel, delivered in 1927
Caleb Haley - fishing vessel, delivered in 1928
Bainbridge - ferry vessel for Puget Sound Navigation Company, delivered in 1928 (disposition: later Jervis Queen, barge 1967)
M/V David B - delivered in 1929 (converted to passenger vessel in 2006)
W.B.Foshay - ferry vessel for Puget Sound Navigation Company, delivered in 1929 (disposition: later Northland 1930, Ottar Jarl 1947, Titika 1955, wrecked 1955)
Vashon - ferry vessel, delivered in 1930
Tongass 100 - freight barge, delivered in 1930
Victoria - recreational vessel, delivered in 1932
MV Kalakala construction begins from burnt-out hull of Peralta in November 1934; maiden voyage July 3, 1935
Robert Gray - tug for USACoE, delivered in 1936 (disposition: to USA as LT 666, returned as Robert Gray, sold, now research/cruise vessel)
KW 252 - freight barge, delivered in 1940
 keel laid 20 February 1941, launched 11 January 1942 and completed 31 August 1942  (USC&GSS: U.S. Coast and Geodetic Survey Ship)
USC&GS Explorer (OSS 28) (1940)
 4 of 32 s
 (YN-1) (11 January 1941)
 (YN-2) (15 February 1941)
 (YN-3) (8 March 1941)
 (YN-4 / AN-9 / ANL-9 / YAG-60) (10 May 1941)
 25 of 30 s
 (8 March 1942)
 (15 April 1942)
 (15 May 1942)
 (12 July 1942)
USS Mobjack AVP-27 / AGP-7 Seaplane Tender 1942
AVP-28 / AGP-6 Oyster Bay 1942
AVP-33 Barataria, WPG-381 / WAVP-381 / WHEC-381 Barataria 1943
 |  1944
 |  |  |  1944
 (WAVP-384 / WHEC-384) 1944
 1944
 1944
 1944
 1945
 1945
 (cancelled 1943)
 (cancelled 1943)
 (cancelled 1943)
 (cancelled 1943)
 (cancelled 1943)
 (cancelled 1943)
 1943
 1942
 1942
 / USNS Josiah Willard Gibbs (T-AGOR-1) 1941
 1943
 1943
 1943
 1943
 (AVP-56) (10 July 1943)
 (AVP-57) (AGP-9) / USCGC Gresham (WAVP-387) (WHEC-387) (WAGW-387) 1943
Delaware – trawler, delivered in 1956 (disposition: Later Angela, now Gimis B)
Naknek – passenger vessel, delivered in 1966
Joker – passenger vessel, delivered in 1967

Seattle Seahawks
The expansion Seattle Seahawks of the National Football League were based at the southern end of the property for their first ten seasons (1976–1985).

See also
:Category:Ships built at Lake Washington Shipyard
Seattle-Tacoma Shipbuilding Corporation#Shipbuilding in Puget Sound

References 

NavSource Naval History Archives
WWII shipbuilding record (Colton Company)

External links

Defunct companies based in Kirkland, Washington
Shipbuilding in Washington (state)
History of Kirkland, Washington